Princess Yeonghye (Hangul: 영혜옹주; Hanja: 永惠翁主, 1858 – 4 July 1872) or firstly honoured as Princess Yeongsuk (Hangul: 영숙옹주; Hanja: 永淑翁主), was the daughter of King Cheoljong of Joseon and Royal Consort Suk-ui of the Geumseong Beom clan. She was the only surviving descendant of Cheoljong.

Biography 
The princess was born in 1858 during her father’s 9th year of reign. She was first honoured as Princess Yeongsuk (영숙옹주; 永淑翁主), but in 1866 her title was changed to Princess Yeonghye (영혜옹주; 永惠翁主).

After her father's death, on January 16, 1864, she lived outside the palace with her mother. The Princess married Park Yung-hyo (박영효), son of Park Won-yang (박원양), on April 13, 1872, but she died three months later.

Family 
 Father: Yi Won-beom, King Cheoljong (조선 철종) (25 July 1831 – 16 January 1864)
 Grandfather: Yi Gwang, Grand Internal Prince Jeongye (전계대원군 이광) (29 April 1785 – 14 December 1841)
 Grandmother: Grand Internal Princess Consort Yongseong of the Yongdam Yeom clan (용성부대부인 용담 염씨) (20 July 1793 – March 1834)
 Mother: Royal Consort Suk-ui of the Geumseong Beom clan (1838 – 1883)
 Grandfather: Beom Won-sik (범원식, 范元植)
 Husband: 
 Park Yung-hyo, Prince Consort Geumreung (박영효, 朴泳孝) (12 June 1861 - 21 September 1939)
 Father-in-law: Chief State Councillor Park Won-yang (영의정 박원양) (1804 – 17 December 1884)
 Mother-in-law: Lady Yi of the Jeonui Yi clan (전의 이씨) (1817 – 1884); Park Won-yang’s second wife

References

19th-century Korean people
19th-century Korean women
1858 births
1872 deaths
Princesses of Joseon
Daughters of kings